Francesco II Ordelaffi (c. 1300–1374), also known as Cecco II, was a lord of Forlì, the son of Sinibaldo Ordelaffi (died 1337, brother of Scarpetta and Francesco) and Orestina Calboli, and the grandson of Teobaldo I Ordelaffi.

Initially he ruled the city with his uncle Francesco, but in 1332 the two were ousted by a Papal Army, remaining in control of Forlimpopoli only. The following year, however, he became the Ghibelline leader in Romagna, receiving the seigniories of Cesena and Bertinoro and establishing a firm rule on Forlì.

In 1337 Francesco imprisoned the Archbishop of Ravenna and was excommunicated by the Pope Benedict XII: however, the struggle ended with the Ordelaffi victorious, since the Pope named him vicar of Forlì, Cesena and Folimpopoli, in exchange of an annual payment. The excommunication was later renewed when he sided for Emperor Louis IV of Bavaria in order to avoid the tribute, being named imperial vicar. Around 1347 he hosted Giovanni Boccaccio in Forlì.

In 1350 Francesco conquered Bertinoro, Meldola, Fontanafredda and Ghiaggiolo, but had to face the opposition of the strong Papal general Gil de Albornoz, supported by the Malatesta of Rimini, as well as another excommunication. Despite the strong resistance of his wife Cia degli Ubaldini and his son Ludovico, Cesena fell on June 21, soon followed by Bertinoro. Francesco and Forlì fell on July 4, 1359, and he was to content of the title of vicar of Forlimpopoli and Castrocaro thenceforth. Later he fought for Bernabò Visconti against the Papal armies, and tried unsuccessfully to reconquer Forlì. He died in Venice in 1374.

His son Sinibaldo was later lord of Forlì.

References

External links
Page at www.condottieridiventura.it

Ordelaffi, Francesco 2
Ordelaffi, Francesco 2
Francesco 2
Ordelaffi, Francesco 2
Ordelaffi, Francesco 2
Lords of Forlì